KPR Institute of Engineering and Technology is an autonomous engineering college established in the year 2009 , Coimbatore, Tamil Nadu. KPRIET is approved by AICTE, New Delhi and affiliated to Anna University, Chennai. Institution is accredited by NAAC with "A" grade and courses are approved by National Board of Accreditation (NBA). Courses were offered under Bachelor's & Master's Degree as well.

KPRIET Counselling Code: 2764

Recognitions 
KPR Institute of Engineering and Technology got 1st position in Coimbatore and 6th Position in Tamilnadu, at Anna University, Academic Performance of November, December 2019 Examinations.

Academics

Undergraduate 
 B.E. - Civil Engineering
 B.E. - Computer Science and Engineering
 B.E. - Electrical and Electronics Engineering
 B.E. - Electronics and Communication Engineering
 B.E. - Mechanical Engineering
 B.E. - Biomedical Engineering
B.Tech. - Artificial Intelligence and Data Science
 B.Tech. - Chemical Engineering
 B.E. - CSE - Artificial Intelligence and Machine Learning
 B.E. - Mechatronics Engineering
 B.Tech. - Computer Science and Business Systems
 B.Tech. - Information Technology

Postgraduate 
 M.E - CAD/CAM
 M.E - Computer Science and Engineering
 M.E - VLSI Design
 M.E - Structural Engineering

Ph. D. Programmes 
Civil Engineering

Computer Science and Engineering

Electronics and Communication Engineering

Mechanical Engineering

Physics

Chemistry

References

External links 
 https://www.kpriet.ac.in

Engineering colleges in Coimbatore
Engineering colleges in Tamil Nadu
Universities and colleges in Coimbatore
Educational institutions established in 2009
2009 establishments in Tamil Nadu